Pantysgallog Low Level Halt railway station was a station that served the village of Pant, Merthyr Tydfil, Wales on the Merthyr, Tredegar and Abergavenny Railway. The station closed in 1958 and the site is now a housing estate.

References 

Disused railway stations in Merthyr Tydfil County Borough
Railway stations in Great Britain opened in 1914
Railway stations in Great Britain closed in 1958
1914 establishments in Wales
1958 disestablishments in Wales
Former London and North Western Railway stations